Lïfe Andruszkow (born 22 September 1955 in Copenhagen, Denmark) is a Danish writer, director/producer and composer working in the fields of European art film, existentialism and indie music.

Background
Lïfe Andruszkow is the son of musician Valdemar Stanislaw Andruszkow and Nanna Andruszkow, born Sørensen. He has two sons David Andruszkow and Paulo Andruszkow; the former a writer and event manager, the latter a composer/performer. He has one sister Inge Merete Damkilde and one grandson Isaac Andruszkow (Zac). Lïfe Andruszkow graduated in 2010 as MA in film and philosophy at the University of Copenhagen.

Writer

After graduating as MA in film and philosophy Lïfe Andruszkow has written two volumes on the subject 'the existentialism in European art film'. Based on the French philosophers Jean-Paul Sartre, Albert Camus, Simone de Beauvoir and Merleau-Ponty he discuss the film Smultronstället by Swedish director Ingmar Bergman in his first book Existentialismen hos Ingmar Bergman (2011), and the film trilogy Trois couleurs: bleu, blanc, rouge by Polish director Krzysztof Kieślowski in his second book Existentialismen hos Krzysztof Kieślowski (2012). Lïfe Andruszkow is currently writing on a novel, The Sun Beyond Heaven [Himlen Bag Solen].

Director/producer
In 1989-91 Lïfe Andruszkow made his first short film as director/producer Tones Of An Outsider, an epic music video dramatized on the novel L'Étranger by Albert Camus in cooperation with director/photographer Torben Skjødt Jensen. Since then Lïfe Andruszkow have made several short film, music videos and documentaries; notable the music video Promises (1998) in cooperation with director/photographer Jenö Farkas on behalf of Nomad film and the short film The Yellow Wallpaper (2007) based on the short story of same title The Yellow Wallpaper (1892) by Charlotte Perkins Gilman. In 2008 Lïfe Andruszkow formed CITYZENZ FILM:MEDIA:COMMUNICATION under which he works as writer/director/producer in Copenhagen, Paris, London and New York. Lïfe Andruszkow is currently working on his first fiction film Au bout des rêves to be shot in France having the cast of French, German and Danish actors in the main roles.

Composer/producer
From 1981-2010 Lïfe Andruszkow has composed and written lyrics on behalf of bands, theatre, musical and film. As composer he was given a grant by The National Art Fund of Denmark (1990) to work as such in Cité internationale des arts in Paris; subsequently Lïfe Andruszkow was enlisted in Who's Who, in the volume 'Popular music'. His major compositions for bands has been for THE LAW with the album False Truth (1982), for ART EXIST with the album Aubaude Dolorose (1985), for THE ACT with the album Dancing In Burning Silhouettes (1989), for LïFE with the album Bridges Broken (2004), and the latest album On the Verge of Surrender (2008) for the band HUMAN DOLLS. In 1986 Lïfe Andruszkow composed and produced the musical Flying Images (Flyvende Billeder) for Husets Teater, Copenhagen, in cooperation with writer/director Kamma Andersen. In 2001 Lïfe Andruszkow composed music for another musical The Ballad of Suzy in cooperation with artist Zadis Viola. As film composer Lïfe Andruszkow have written the score for the fiction film Vertikal (1994) by Jenö Farkas for Nomad film, the scores for several short film, notably  The Yellow Wallpaper (2007), the scores for several documentaries, notably Heaven is my Ceiling (da:Himmelen er mit tag) (2000) by Jenö Farkas for Nomad film and Un monde de thé (2009) by Pierre Barboni for Kea Production.

References

1. ↑ Andruszkow, Lïfe (2011). Andruszkow, Lïfe. ed. Existentialismen hos Ingmar Bergman. 1 (1 udg.). København, Danmark: Cityzenz Publishing. s. 81. .

2. ↑ Andruszkow, Lïfe (2012). Andruszkow, Lïfe. ed. Existentialismen hos Krzysztof Kieślowski. 1 (1 udg.). København, Danmark: Cityzenz Publishing. s. 222. .

21st-century Danish writers
Film directors from Copenhagen
Danish film producers
Danish composers
1955 births
Living people
Writers from Copenhagen
University of Copenhagen alumni